Abady is a surname. Notable people with the surname include:

Jacques Abady (1872–1964), British lawyer
Josephine Abady (1949–2002), American stage director, film director, and producer
Shy Abady (born 1965), Israeli artist

See also
Abay (name)